The city of Helsinki has plans for a radical expansion of the tram network within the 2021–2035 time horizon, as laid out in the Helsinki City Plan, approved by the City Council in October 2016. Below is a list of confirmed and proposed future expansions of the network. The largest confirmed projects are the  trunk line 550 ("Jokeri") and the  connection in the direction of East Helsinki to the island of Laajasalo, which will include the longest bridge in Finland. Together, these two will effectively double the track length of the network.

Reorganisation of the tram lines

There are currently two main plans for the tram network of Helsinki.

The first plan includes small- to medium-length extensions, such as the works in Itä-Pasila and Jätkäsaari, and the extension to Laajasalo. Under this plan, the tram lines at the end of 2027 would be arranged as follows:

From roughly 2035, the lines would be arranged as follows:

  Lines 2 and 3 do not turn around at their shared terminus at the Olympia Terminal: they only change their line numbers.
  Lines 3 and 7 will not turn around at their shared terminus at Kaivopuisto: they will only change their line numbers.
  This line and the tramways that comprise it are only tentatively proposed.
  This extension and the tramways that comprise it are only tentatively proposed.

Improvements to the connectivity and capacity of the network

A number of short segments of new track in areas already covered by the network are being planned in order to improve the connectivity and capacity of the network.

Topeliuksenkatu

The planned tracks would run along Topeliuksenkatu from Runeberginkatu to Mannerheimintie, in parallel to the tramway on Mannerheimintie. This would provide additional capacity and a faster route in the direction of Mannerheimintie. The Topeliuksenkatu tramway is widely considered to be a requirement for further extensions of lines 4 and 10, which include the Munkkivuori extension. This tramway was one of the proposals in a 2006 study named "" ("Tram 2015").

Fredrikinkatu

In Kamppi the tracks on the north and south ends of Fredrikinkatu are separated by a  gap.  New tracks are planned along Fredrikinkatu between the junctions at Bulevardi (south end) and Malminrinne/Urho Kekkosen katu (north end) to connect this gap and provide a parallel north–south connection to the congested main tramway along Mannerheimintie.

Extensions to new areas

The opening of the Vuosaari Harbour in 2008 freed up harbour areas in Jätkäsaari and Kalasatama near the city centre, as well as the oil terminal in Kruunuvuorenranta on the Laajasalo island, for development. A large rail yard in Pasila, which was used for handling freight rail traffic to Jätkäsaari and Kalasatama, was also freed up. Helsinki is developing all four areas as new mixed-use urban districts, and in each case, the city decided to base the public transport in these areas on extensions to the tram network. (Pasila has a railway station that is served by all of the commuter trains, and Kalasatama has a metro station.)

Jätkäsaari and Hernesaari

The building of tramways in Jätkäsaari has proceeded along with the construction of the buildings of the new district. The use of bi-directional trams was considered for the tramway extensions, but in the end, HKL decided to build the tracks with conventional return loops and to dismantle temporary loops as necessary.

As of April 2022, only the new return loops in Tahitinkatu and Bunkkeri remain to be built. The completion of this stretch has been projected for 2022–2024. In the previous phases, tracks were extended from Ruoholahti to Saukonpaasi (opened 1 January 2012), from Kamppi to the old ferry terminal (opened 13 August 2012), from the old to the new ferry terminal (opened February 2017), from Jätkäsaarenlaituri along Välimerenkatu street to the return loop at Saukonpaasi (opened August 2017) and from Saukonpaasi to the new ferry terminal (opened May 2021).

Various versions of the lines and routes to Jätkäsaari have been proposed since the beginning of the planning. As of December 2017, lines 7, 8 and 9 are routed on Jätkäsaari according to the plan approved in 2015 (see Reorganisation). Line 6 awaits the completion of new tracks to Hernesaari. By 2024, line 6 will be rerouted from its current termini at Eiranranta to Hernesaari. It was extended from Hietalahti to Eiranranta in 2021.

Kalasatama

The construction of new housing in the former harbour area of Kalasatama began in 2011. Kalasatama is served by a metro station, and the city has not built tramways in advance of the housing in Kalasatama in the way it has done in Jätkäsaari. At least two tram lines are planned to be extended into the Kalasatama area, one from the city centre in the south over new bridges (alignment to be decided), and one from the west from Hämeentie.

Laajasalo

The city council of Helsinki decided on 31 August 2016 to build a tramway to the island of Laajasalo, located to the east of Helsinki city centre. The bridges will have bicycle and pedestrian lanes in addition to the tramway, but no lanes for private cars.

Ilmala

Line number 9, opened in August 2008, was originally planned as early as 1990 to link Ilmala with Merikatu in southern Ullanlinna. However, in the first phase of construction, the northern part of the route was truncated into Itä-Pasila in order to cut costs, while the southern terminus was placed in Kolmikulma due to opposition to tram tracks by people living along the planned new line.

Although shortly before the opening of line 9 HKL stated the continuation to Merikatu had been abandoned permanently, within weeks of the opening of the line, extending the route to Merikatu was again proposed, due to complaints from inhabitants of Ullanlinna following the termination of bus line 17. Subsequently, HKL stated they would be "actively acting to expand the tramline to Merikatu". Interlacing the tracks on some sections on Korkeavuorenkatu is under consideration as a space-saving measure, allowing a larger amount of parking space to be maintained along the street. At the time in 2008, HKL stated that a different line would be routed to Merikatu in the case that line 9 would go to Jätkäsaari instead. The southern terminus of line 9 was ultimately extended to the West Harbour ferry terminal in Jätkäsaari and opened for traffic on 13 August 2012.

In addition to lengthening the line, moving the line from Kaarlenkatu and Helsinginkatu to Fleminginkatu in Kallio was proposed on 10 October 2008.

In 2020 the construction began on new tracks from Pasila to Ilmala. Line 9 will start running to Ilmala in August 2022.

Munkkivuori

Helsinki Regional Transport (HSL) has prepared plans for an extension to the residential area of Munkkivuori. The extension has been debated since the district was built in the 1950s. The bus lines that serve the area carry about 5 million passengers per year as of 2012, which is a sufficient ridership for a tram line. The bus lines have been criticised for being slow and having unpredictable running times. HSL collected comments from the public on several different alignment options in March and April 2012. However, there is no decision on the funding or construction of the extension.

Trunk line 550 ("Jokeri")

The core bus line 550, formerly branded Jokeri ("The Joker", after Joukkoliikenteen kehämäinen raideinvestointi – "A circular rail investment for public transportation"), will be converted to light rail. The city councils of Helsinki and Espoo approved the construction project in June 2016, after the state of Finland decided to participate in funding the construction. The rail line is preliminarily projected to open in 2024. The construction of the  light rail line, without rolling stock or a depot, is projected to cost €274 million as of June 2016, with rolling stock and a depot projected to additionally cost up to €95 and €65 million respectively.

Other possibilities

A private group consisting of members of the Finnish Tramway Society and students of Helsinki University of Technology drew up plans for a new tram line linking Arabia to Pasila railway station in order to improve the public transport connections of Kumpula. The proposed line, provisionally numbered line 5, could either utilise the disused freight railway line in Southern Kumpula or only existing tram tracks, including a stretch on Sturenkatu between Mäkelänkatu and Hämeentie that is presently only used for depot movements. The proposal gained public interest, and on 4 April 2009 the City Planning Board of Helsinki mandated that an official study would be made on a tram line linking Munkkiniemi to Arabia or Kalasatama via Pasila and Kumpula, with provisions made for further extension of the line to Otaniemi in the west and to Viikki in the east.

The possibility of extending the line 1 to the Käpylä railway station (or further to Oulunkylä) in the north and rerouting the same lines through the unused tracks on Linjat in Kallio have been brought up as possible future projects to improve passenger numbers on the unpopular line. A 2012 proposal for the reorganization of surface traffic after the completion of the "Pisara" connection included an extension of line 1 to the Käpylä station, but for a different reason. The Helsinki City Rail Loop is an underground loop of the commuter railway network that would distribute passengers to three new underground stations in central Helsinki. The proposal for after the city rail loop construction for surface traffic includes a new bus terminal at Käpylä. Bus lines that currently continue to the city centre would terminate at the Käpylä station, where the passengers could make a connection to commuter trains or an extended tram line 1.

In addition to the above, expansion of the tram network from Arabia to Viikki, Käpylä to Koskela and Pikku Huopalahti to Haaga have been mentioned as potential long-term projects.

A construction of a light rail or tram system has also been proposed as a possible solution of arranging public transport in the Östersundom area annexed by Helsinki from Vantaa and Sipoo on 1 January 2009. An extension of the Helsinki Metro was originally planned as the main form of public transport for this area, but on 20 February 2009 a newspaper reported that a light rail system is being studied as an alternative to supplement or replace the Metro connection to this area due to the lower costs of a light rail link. If built, the light rail link could be extended as far east as Porvoo. Östersundom is located in eastern Helsinki, and as such the proposed new system would be completely unconnected with the currently existing tram system. It could, however, connect with the future Jokeri line in Itäkeskus.

The construction of some of the expansions to the network as trolleybus lines was studied in a 2009 report by Helsinki City Transport, but the city decided to drop the trolleybus plans for the foreseeable future in 2011.

2015 funding plan

In April 2015, Helsinki City Transport (HKL) approved a plan for funding tram network projects for 2016–25. These plans are subject to continuous reviews and changes. For instance, most of the items listed here are delayed compared to the plan approved in 2012. The allocations of funds are in millions of euros.

Notes:
 The Kruunuvuorenranta bridge is planned to be a future landmark in Helsinki, a 1 km long cable-stayed bridge for trams, pedestrians and bicyclists. It is planned to provide a quick connection to the city center from the new district of Kruunuvuorenranta (under construction as of May 2015) as well as existing suburbs on the island of Laajasalo.
 Trunk line 550 ("Jokeri") extends to the Espoo municipality. This plan only covers HKL's investment for part within the borders of Helsinki.

See also 

 Helsinki Metro
 Trams in Finland

References

Bibliography 
Helsinki City Transport

 
 
 
 
 
 

Finnish Tramway Society

 

Helsingin Sanomat

 
 
 

Miscellaneous

External links 

 
 Tram line route map (Official map )
 Tram line route map with stops  (Official map )
 Raide-Jokeri (Official website)

Transport in Helsinki
Tram transport in Finland
Proposed railway lines in Finland